The Mihranids of Gugark were an Iranian princely dynasty, which ruled the Armeno-Iberian frontier region of Gugark from  to the 8th-century.

History 
Albeit the family claimed descent from the Persian Sasanian rulers of Iran, they were in reality a branch of the House of Mihran, one of the Seven Great Houses of Iran. Its first  was Peroz, who dislodged the Gusharid  of Gugark, thus initiating Mihranid rule there. During this period, the Mihranids enjoyed warm relations with the newly established Chosroid dynasty of Iberia, also a branch of the Mihranids. Peroz was the son-in-law of Mirian III, the first Christian king of Iberia. Although Peroz refused to convert to Christianity, he still remained loyal to the Iberian king. He and his followers finally converted during the rule of the Mirian III's son and successor Aspacures III.

Gugark was normally subject to the Kingdom of Armenia, but fell under the authority of Iberia after the Sasanians and Romans partitioned Armenia in 387. Not much earlier, the Iberian Kingdom had fallen under the authority of the Sasanians after an invasion by the King of Kings Shapur II. Varsken travelled to the Iranian court in 470, where he converted to Zoroastrianism and shifted his allegiance from the Iberian monarchy to the Sasanian Empire. As a reward for his conversion, he was given the viceroyalty of Caucasian Albania and a daughter of Peroz in marriage. Espousing his pro-Iranian position, he attempted to force his family to convert to Zoroastrianism, including his first wife Shushanik (a daughter of Vardan), which eventually resulted in her martyrdom. His policies were unacceptable to the Iberian king Vakhtang I, who had him killed and then revolted against Iran in 482. The  Vahram-Arshusha V sided with the Sasanians during the Byzantine–Sasanian War of 602–628, and was captured at the Battle of Nineveh on 12 December 627.

In the 8th-century, the lands and titles of the Mihranids was acquired by the Armenian Bagratuni princes, thus marking the end of the Mihranids of Gugark.

List of 
Based on available sources, the modern historian Cyril Toumanoff has deduced a list of the ruling Mihranid  of Gugark, albeit it remains incomplete.

References

Sources 
 
 
 
 
 
 
  
 
  

Mihranids
Medieval history of the Caucasus
Iranian dynasties